The District of Columbia Home Rule Act is a United States federal law passed on December 24, 1973, which devolved certain congressional powers of the District of Columbia to local government, furthering District of Columbia home rule. In particular, it includes the District Charter (also called the Home Rule Charter), which provides for an elected mayor and the Council of the District of Columbia. The council is composed of a chair elected at large and twelve members, four of whom are elected at large, and one from each of the District's eight wards. Council members are elected to four-year terms.

Under the "Home Rule" government, Congress reviews all legislation passed by the council before it can become law and retains authority over the District's budget. Also, the President appoints the District's judges, and the District still has no voting representation in Congress. Because of these and other limitations on local government, many citizens of the District continue to lobby for greater autonomy, such as complete statehood.

The Home Rule Act specifically prohibits the council from enacting certain laws that, among other restrictions, would:
 lend public credit for private projects;
 impose a tax on individuals who work in the District but live elsewhere;
 make any changes to the Heights of Buildings Act of 1910;
 pass any law changing the composition or jurisdiction of the local courts;
 enact a local budget that is not balanced; and
 gain any additional authority over the National Capital Planning Commission, Washington Aqueduct, or District of Columbia National Guard.

Laws blocked by Congress 
The Home Rule Act allows Congress to block any laws passed by the D.C. council. Since its enactment, Congress has exercised this power several times.
 In 1988, Congress voted to block D.C. from expending local funds to cover abortion services through Medicaid. This was repealed in 2009 but then reinstated in 2011.
 Passed by the D.C. Council in 1992, the Health Care Benefits Expansion Act allowed both gay and straight couples to register as domestic partners, allowing familial recognition for such things as hospital visits and allowing the partners of D.C. government employees to purchase private health insurance, was blocked by Congress. The act was finally allowed to go into effect in 2001.
 In 1996, the D.C. Council passed a clean needle exchange program law. However, in 1998, Congress voted to block the law. In 2007, Congress voted to lift the ban, thus allowing the law to go into effect.
 In 1998, Congress voted to block Initiative 59 – Legalization of Marijuana for Medical Treatment Initiative of 1998 – via the Barr amendment. This also caused the result of the referendum to be withheld. When this was challenged in court, it was determined that withholding the result of the referendum violated the First Amendment. In response to this, another amendment was passed in 2000 that simply overturned Initiative 59. In 2009, Congress voted to overturn the ban on Initiative 59, allowing D.C.'s medical marijuana law to go into effect, with the first medical marijuana sale occurring in 2013.
 In 2014, Congress voted to block Initiative 71 – Legalization of Possession of Minimal Amounts of Marijuana for Personal Use Act of 2014 – by blocking funds from being used to enact laws, rules or regulations for reducing or legalizing any Schedule I drug. However, since this was passed after the results of Initiative 71 had already been announced, it did not prevent the legalization of marijuana, but had the effect of leaving marijuana legal, but without the authority to expend funds on enacting regulations or taxation.

References

External links
 District of Columbia Home Rule Act (PDF/details) as amended in the GPO Statute Compilations collection

Home rule and voting rights of the District of Columbia
1973 in law
1973 in Washington, D.C.
United States federal territory and statehood legislation
Legal history of the District of Columbia
District of Columbia law